The 2016 United States presidential election in Florida was held on Tuesday, November 8, 2016, as part of the 2016 United States presidential election in which all 50 states plus the District of Columbia participated. Florida voters chose electors to represent them in the Electoral College via a popular vote, pitting the Republican Party's nominee, businessman Donald Trump, and running mate Indiana Governor Mike Pence against Democratic Party nominee, former Secretary of State Hillary Clinton, and her running mate Virginia Senator Tim Kaine. Florida has 29 electoral votes in the Electoral College.

Trump carried the state with a plurality of 49.0% of the popular vote, which included a 1.2% winning margin over Clinton, who had 47.8% of the vote. Trump consequently became the first Republican to win the White House without carrying Hillsborough County since Calvin Coolidge in 1924. Trump was also the first Republican presidential candidate to carry St. Lucie County since 1992, and the first to carry Jefferson and Monroe Counties since 1988; all three of these counties were last carried by George H. W. Bush. 

Florida voted for Donald Trump by a margin of 1.2%. It was the fifth-closest state result, with only Wisconsin, Michigan, New Hampshire and Pennsylvania closer. According to the National Election Pool, Trump got a majority of 54% from the Cuban-American voters in the state—in comparison to the 71% of Clinton support by Latino voters from other origins.

Primary elections

Democratic primary

Democratic debate
March 9, 2016 – Kendall, Florida 

The eighth debate took place on March 9, 2016, at 9:00 PM Eastern Standard Time in Building 7 of the Kendall Campus of Miami Dade College in Kendall, Florida. It was broadcast through a partnership between Univision and The Washington Post. The debate was discussed during a job interview conducted in early 2015 between the Democratic National Committee's then-Communications Director Mo Elleithee and future Hispanic Media Director Pablo Manriquez. After starting at the DNC in April 2015, Manriquez "talked about the idea for a debate for Democratic candidates on Univision to anyone who had ears to listen."  The debate was officially announced on November 2, 2015.

Opinion polling

Results

Three candidates appeared on the Democratic presidential primary ballot:

Republican primary

Republican debate
March 10, 2016 – Coral Gables, Florida

The twelfth debate was the fourth and final debate to air on CNN and led into the Florida, Illinois, North Carolina, Missouri, and Ohio primaries on March 15. The candidates debated at the University of Miami, moderated by Jake Tapper and questioned by CNN chief political correspondent Dana Bash, Salem Radio Network talk-show host Hugh Hewitt, and Washington Times contributor Stephen Dinan. The Washington Times cohosted the debate. The debate was originally scheduled considering the likelihood that no candidate would clinch the Republican nomination before March 15, due to the overall size of the field. On the day of the debate, CNN summarized the immediate stakes: "This debate comes just five days ahead of 'Super Tuesday 3', when more than 350 delegates are decided, including winner-take-all contests in Florida and Ohio. Both Trump and Rubio are predicting [a win in] Florida. For Trump, a win here would fuel his growing momentum and further grow his delegate lead; for Rubio, losing his home state could be the death knell for his campaign."  This was the twelfth and final debate appearance of Rubio, who suspended his campaign on March 15.

Polling

Results

Twelve candidates appeared on the Republican presidential primary ballot: 
.

Green primary
The Green Party held a primary in Florida on July 31, 2016. Early voting began on July 25.

On July 31, 2016, the Green Party of Florida announced that Jill Stein had won the Florida primary via instant-runoff voting.

General election

Predictions
The following are final 2016 predictions from various organizations for Florida as of Election Day.

Polling

In early polling conducted in late 2015, Trump started with strong momentum and won almost every poll against Clinton by margins varying from 2 to 8 points. In March 2016, Trump's early momentum seemed to slow, as Clinton won every poll until June 2016, when Trump won a poll 45% to 44%. Most polling conducted throughout the summer was favorable to Clinton, but both candidates were neck and neck in late August and early September, with neither having a consistent lead. From mid September to October 20, Clinton won every poll but one. In the last weeks, polling was extremely close, with neither candidate taking the lead. The third to last and fourth to last poll ended in a tie, but Trump won the last poll 50% to 46%. The average of the last three polls showed Trump ahead 47.3% to 46.7%, where the race was essentially tied.

Results

By county
Final results from Florida Division of Elections.

Counties that flipped from Democratic to Republican
Jefferson (largest city: Monticello)
Monroe (largest city: Key West)
Pinellas (largest city: St. Petersburg)
St. Lucie (largest city: Port St. Lucie)

By congressional district
Trump won 14 of 27 congressional districts, while Clinton won 13, including two held by Republicans.

See also 
 United States presidential elections in Florida
 2016 Democratic Party presidential debates and forums
 2016 Democratic Party presidential primaries
 2016 Republican Party presidential debates and forums
 2016 Republican Party presidential primaries

References

Further reading

External links
 RNC 2016 Republican Nominating Process 
 Green papers for 2016 primaries, caucuses, and conventions
 Interactive Map, 2016 Florida Primary Election Results - ap.com
 Decision Desk Headquarter Results for Florida

Presidential
Florida
2016